In 1894 the Darien and Western Railroad was established to take over operations of the Darien Short Line which had gone bankrupt.  The D and W operated a  line between Darien and Midway, Georgia, US, beginning in 1895 and then as far as Ludowici, Georgia, in 1904.  It became part of a multi-railroad merger in 1906 that resulted in the Georgia Coast and Piedmont Railroad.

Defunct Georgia (U.S. state) railroads
American companies established in 1894
Railway companies established in 1894
1906 disestablishments